Shahad Jassem Abdulla Ali Budebs (born 24 August 1994) is an Emirati association football player who plays as a midfielder.

International goal
Scores and results list United Arab Emirates' goal tally first.

References

External links

1994 births
Living people
Sportspeople from Dubai
Emirati women's footballers
United Arab Emirates women's international footballers
Women's association football midfielders